The 2012 New Zealand Māori rugby union tour of England was a series of three matches played by the Māori All Blacks (then known as the New Zealand Māori team) in England.

Despite playing three fixtures, only one would be against a test international nation (Canada); this was the second time the two teams met. The Māori team also faced English domestic team Leicester Tigers and a RFU Championship XV, a team consisting of players that compete in England's second-tier club tournament, RFU Championship.

Fixtures

Leicester Tigers

Notes:
 The Tigers returned to using their traditional lettered-flocked jerseys for this non-test match. They last used this system when they hosted Australia in 2010.

RFU Championship XV

Canada

Notes:
 This was not considered a Test Match and is part of the new scheme the IRB introduced to increase the competitiveness in tier 2 teams ahead of the next World Cup.
 At the 21st minute, referee Martin Fox pulled a hamstring, prompting assistant referee Ross Campbell to take over as the official.

Squad
It was announced that Highlanders head coach Jamie Joseph, would coach the side for the 2012 tour, after leading the Māori's to success over England in 2010.

Joseph named his 26-man squad on 29 October 2012.

Note: Flags indicate national union as has been defined under IRB eligibility rules. Players may hold more than one non-IRB nationality.

Player statistics
Key
Con: Conversions
Pen: Penalties
DG: Drop goals
Pts: Points

See also
 2012 end-of-year rugby union tests

References

2012 rugby union tours
2012
Rugby union tours of England
2012 in New Zealand rugby union
2012–13 in English rugby union
2012–13 RFU Championship
2012 in Canadian rugby union
Leicester Tigers matches